Achille Serra was a Bolognese architect who was involved in rebuilding the Basilica di San Marino from 1826 to 1838.

References

19th-century Italian architects
Architects from Bologna
Year of birth missing
Year of death missing